Autodiff may refer to:

 Automatic differentiation, a set of techniques to numerically evaluate the derivative of a function specified by a computer program.
 White blood cell differential